Utricularia chiakiana is an affixed or suspended aquatic carnivorous plant that belongs to the genus Utricularia (family Lentibulariaceae). It is native to Venezuela and was first described by Sadashi Komiya and Chiaki Shibata in 1997.

See also 
 List of Utricularia species

References 

Carnivorous plants of South America
Flora of Venezuela
chiakiana
Plants described in 1997